Gary Cox may refer to:
 Gary Cox (Gaelic footballer)
 Gary Cox (philosopher) (born 1964), British philosopher and author
 Gary Cox (musician) (died 2012), American guitarist and vocalist 
 Gary W. Cox, American political scientist